Robert Emerson (November 4, 1903 – February 4, 1959) was an American scientist noted for his discovery that plants have two distinct photosynthetic reaction centres.

Family
Emerson was born in 1903 in New York City, the son of Dr. Haven Emerson, Health Commissioner of New York City, and Grace Parrish Emerson, the sister of Maxfield Parrish. Emerson was the brother of John Haven Emerson the inventor of the iron lung.

He married Claire Garrison, and they had three sons, and a daughter.

Career
Emerson received a master's degree in 1929 from Harvard, and received his doctorate from the University of Berlin working in the laboratory of Otto Warburg.

Thomas Hunt Morgan invited him to join the Biology Division at the California Institute of Technology where he worked from 1930 to 1937, and again for a year in 1941 and 1945. From 1942 to 1945 he worked on producing rubber from the guayule shrub for the American Rubber Company.

In 1947 he moved to the Botany Department of the University of Illinois, where he remained for the rest of his life.

Experimental results
Emerson's first "important" result was the quantification of the ratio of chlorophyll molecules to oxygen molecules produced by photosynthesis. Emerson and William Arnold found that "the yield per flash reached a maximum when just 1 out of 2500 chlorophylls absorbed a quantum".

Next, in 1939, Emerson demonstrated that between 8 and 12 quanta of light were needed to produce one molecule of oxygen. These results were controversial, as they contradicted Warburg who reported 4, then 3, and finally 2 quanta. This dispute was settled after the death of both men, and it is now agreed that Emerson was correct, and the accepted modern value is 8 – 10 quanta.

In 1957, Emerson reported results that are now called the Emerson effect, the excess rate of photosynthesis after chloroplasts are simultaneously exposed to light of wavelength 670 nm (red light), and 700 nm (far red light).

These results were later shown to be the first experimental demonstration that there are two photosynthetic reaction centres in plants.

Death
Emerson died in the crash of American Airlines Flight 320 in New York City in 1959.

References

1903 births
1959 deaths
Accidental deaths in New York (state)
American botanists
California Institute of Technology faculty
Harvard University alumni
Researchers of photosynthesis
Scientists from New York City
University of Illinois faculty
Victims of aviation accidents or incidents in 1959
Victims of aviation accidents or incidents in the United States